The Huggetts Abroad is a 1949 British film starring Jack Warner, Kathleen Harrison, Petula Clark and Susan Shaw. It was the final film of The Huggetts. The film was less commercially successful than its predecessors. A sequel, Christmas with the Huggetts, was planned but never made.

Plot
After Joe Huggett loses his job, the family decide to emigrate to South Africa, travelling via a land route that takes them across Africa. On their journey they become entangled with a diamond smuggler.

Their truck breaks down in the desert and Joe and his son-in-law Jimmy have to trek across the sand to find help for the family.

Cast
 Jack Warner as Joe Huggett 
 Kathleen Harrison as Ethel Huggett 
 Susan Shaw as Susan Huggett 
 Petula Clark as Pet Huggett 
 Dinah Sheridan as Jane Huggett 
 Hugh McDermott as Bob McCoy 
 Jimmy Hanley as Jimmy Gardner 
 Peter Hammond as Peter Hawtrey 
 John Blythe as Gowan 
 Amy Veness as Grandma Huggett 
 Peter Illing as Algerian Detective 
 Frith Banbury as French Doctor 
 Olaf Pooley as Straker 
 Esma Cannon as Brown Owl
 Sheila Raynor as Woman with Straker

Production
Jane Hylton was ill so her part was played by Dinah Sheridan. She was then married to Jimmy Hanley.

References

External links

The Huggetts Abroad at BFI
The Huggets Abroad at Letterbox DVD
The Huggetts Abroad at TCMDB
Complete film at Internet Archive

Films directed by Ken Annakin
1949 films
Gainsborough Pictures films
British black-and-white films
British comedy films
1949 comedy films
Films set in Africa
Films scored by Antony Hopkins
Films with screenplays by Ted Willis, Baron Willis
The Huggetts (film series)
1940s English-language films
1940s British films